Viorel P. Barbu (born 14 June 1941) is a Romanian mathematician, specializing in partial differential equations, control theory, and stochastic differential equations.

Biography
He was born in Deleni, Vaslui County, Romania.  He attended the Mihail Kogălniceanu High School in Vaslui and then the Costache Negruzzi National College in Iași. Barbu completed his undergraduate degree at the Alexandru Ioan Cuza University of Iași in 1964, and his Ph.D. at the same university in 1969.  His doctoral advisor was Adolf Haimovici; his dissertation thesis was titled Regularity Theory of Pseudodifferential Operators. He became a professor at the University of Iași in 1980. His Ph.D. students there included Gheorghe Moroșanu and Daniel Tătaru.

In 1993, he was elected a titular member of the Romanian Academy. In 2011 he was awarded the Order of the Star of Romania, Knight rank by President Traian Băsescu.

Bibliography
Some of his books and papers are:

 Analysis And Control Of Nonlinear Infinite Dimensional Systems 
 Optimization, Optimal Control and Partial Differential Equations
 Nonlinear semigroups and differential equations in Banach spaces 
 Hamilton-Jacobi Equations on Hilbert Space 
 Stochastic Porous Media Equations 
 Nonlinear Differential Equations of Monotone Types in Banach Spaces 
 Convexity and Optimization in Banach Spaces 
 Optimal Control of Variational Inequalities

References

External links
 
 

1941 births
People from Vaslui County
Romanian mathematicians
Alexandru Ioan Cuza University alumni
Academic staff of Alexandru Ioan Cuza University
Titular members of the Romanian Academy
Living people
Control theorists
Knights of the Order of the Star of Romania
Costache Negruzzi National College alumni
PDE theorists